The Minera Lead Mines were a mining operation and are now a country park and tourist centre in the village of Minera near Wrexham, in Wrexham County Borough, Wales.

History
The first written record of lead mining at Minera dates back to 1296, when Edward I of England hired miners from the site to work in his new mines in Devon. Not all of them vacated the area, however, as mining went on until the Black Death in 1349, when it ended.

In 1527, two men bought the rights to mine on the site, but deeper workings were unworkable due to the presence of underground rivers, and the inability to prevent flooding. The inability to pay for steam engines to pump out water closed the mines again until 1845, when John Taylor & Sons, mining agents from Flintshire, formed the Minera Mining Company. They were able to build a stationary steam engine on site, and also blast caves from down in the valley into the mines, for extra drainage. The steam engine was a Cornish engine (i.e. a Beam engine), typical for stationary engines at the time.

John Taylor & Sons had used a £30,000 investment at the time, yet the profits for 1864 alone were £60,000 (equivalent to over £4 Million in 2008. By 1900, the price of lead and zinc had fallen dramatically, while the price of coal used for the steam engine rose. The stationary steam engine stopped work in 1909. The owners sold off the mines and all assets by 1914.

Transport
For transport, the Mines had their own railway branch line, which connected with the end of the Wrexham and Minera Branch at Minera Limeworks. The mines also had their own steam locomotive, a Manning Wardle 0-6-0ST (Works No. 21) Henrietta. The lead ore would be taken to Wrexham for transport nationally, and Coal brought back. The line was dismantled when the mines closed, as the line was privately owned, however were rebuilt to serve nearby clay pits. Plans to build a tourist narrow gauge railway on the line were made in the 1990s, but have not progressed.

Restoration
The workings and local area underwent massive restoration and regeneration funded by Wrexham County Borough Council and the Welsh Development Agency beginning in 1988 to make sure the lead, Zinc and lime spoil tips didn't contaminate local water supplies, the Engine house was rebuilt and fitted with replica machinery, as the original steam engine was removed in 1914. A visitor Centre was opened for public use, and the engine house is part of a tour. It is a site of tourism for Wrexham County Borough Council.

In 2004, the site was attacked by vandals, but this was repaired by the council in 2005.

Sources
Minera Lead Mines – official museum site
The Story of Minera Lead Mines – Wrexham County Borough Council

References

Defunct mining companies of the United Kingdom
Mining in Wales
Mining museums in Wales
Museums in Wrexham County Borough
Parks in Wrexham County Borough